The College of Engineering Vadakara (CEV) is an engineering college in Kozhikode district of  Kerala, established in 1999.

The first engineering college under the Co-operative Academy of Professional Education (CAPE), Thiruvananthapuram, established by Govt. of Kerala, started functioning in June 1999. The college is affiliated to APJ Abdul Kalam Technological University  and approved by All India Council for Technical Education (AICTE).

General information
The college began in the year 1999 using the Maniyoor High School building as a temporary campus. The college was later shifted to the present day campus which is its own. The campus is situated in Kurunthodi near maniyoor, 10 km from Vadakara railway station. Stretched over 10 hectares of land, the campus is one of the greenest campuses in the state.
The campus consists of an Administrative block and five academic blocks designated to different departments along with laboratories, workshops, hostels, canteens and courts/grounds. Its one of the ten colleges run by the Co-operative Academy of Professional Education (CAPE) under Govt. of Kerala. Its one of the few ISO and NAAC certified technical institutions in the state.

Academic
The college offers undergraduate (B.Tech.) programmes and graduate programmes under APJKTU.
Undergraduate programmes include :
Civil Engineering 
Electrical & Electronics Engineering 
Computer Science & Engineering 
Electronics & Communication Engineering 
Information Technology

The college also offers Master of Computer Applications (MCA) at post graduate level.

Admissions

The college admits students on the basis of following entrance exams:
Kerala Engineering Entrance Examination, KEAM conducted by the Office of the Commissioner of Entrance Exams run by the Government of Kerala
B Tech Lateral Entry Examination, LET conducted by Joint Controller of Technical Examinations by the Government of Kerala

Admissions are also made to NRI seats under college management.

Acreditations

The college is accredited by NAAC with 'B+' Grade.
The college is an ISO 9001 – 2015 certified Institution.

Branches of study

Civil Engineering
The department offers Bachelor Of Technology (B.Tech.) degree in civil engineering. It admits classes each of up to 60 students each year. The department consists of around 20 faculty members including Professors, Associate professors and Assistant professors. The department also owns and functions laboratories such as:
Drafting Lab
Strength of materials Lab
Transportation Lab
Survey Lab
Fluid mechanics Lab etc.

Electronics & Communication Engineering
The department is mainly concerned with the B-Tech program in ECE and has a team of faculty and technical staff for helping the students in knowledge transfer processes involved.  Department has set up the following laboratories with state of the art gadgets:

Communication Lab
Advanced Microprocessor Lab
Digital & Microprocessor Lab
Electronic Circuits Lab
Embedded Lab

The major equipments/instruments available in the laboratories include CROs, Digital Storage Oscilloscope, SMPS Trainer Kits, Digital IC Trainers, 8085 Microprocessor Trainers, Universal Programmer, PIC Programmer, EPROM Eraser, 8086 Microprocessor Trainer Kits, PC Based Microcontroller 8952, Spectrum Analyzer, Optical fiber trainer, Colour TV Trainer, DSP Kits, MATLAB Software and the like.

Electronics & Instrumentation Engineering
This department is responsible mainly to conduct B-Tech Program in EIE. The program is designed with an industrial orientation and seeks to train engineers with exposure to technological practices.  The chief infrastructural facilities of this department are:

Process Control Lab
Instrumentation Lab and
DSP Lab

The major equipments available in these laboratories include Digital Storage Oscilloscope, different types of Transducers, different bridges (trainers), TMS 320C50 Processor based DSP kits, Temperature, Level, Pressure and Flow process Trainers.

Information Technology
Computer Graphics Lab
System Programming Lab
Internet Lab
Multimedia & Web Oriented Project Lab
An array of Pentium IV and Celeron systems with installed software such as Microsoft Visual Studio, MS-SQL Server, My SQL, Microsoft Frontpage, Java, Turbo C and MASM are provided in these Labs. ASP and PHP supports are also available in Project lab with Internet Information Server (IIS) and Apache as web servers.

Computer Science Engineering
The department offers B-Tech program in CSE and is staffed by faculty and supporting technical staff.  The department has organised the following laboratories and Central Computer Centre to cater to the needs of the academic programs offered by the college.

 Network & Operating System Lab
 Linux Lab
 PC Lab
 Computer Hardware Lab

All labs are equipped with Intel P-IV, Celeron, AMD processor machines and Software like Windows 2000 Server, Windows XP, 98, Redhat Linux, Visual Studio 6.0, Microsoft Office 2000, MS SQL Server, Turbo C++, MASM, TASM and Java.

Master of Computer Applications (MCA)
The Department of Computer Applications was started in July 2010.

Student organisations

The college houses and promotes various students organisations like:
ISTE Student Chapter
IEEE Student Branch
National Service Scheme
Innovation and  Entrepreneurship Development Cell (IEDC)
Computer Society of India

Facilities

Digital Library
Central Computing Facility
Hostels
Innovation centre
Basketball court
WiFi connectivity

References

External links 
Official Website
 Google Plus Page

Engineering colleges in Kerala
Cooperatives in Kerala
Universities and colleges in Kozhikode district
Educational institutions established in 1999
1999 establishments in Kerala